Dragon style can refer to:

A style of the martial arts called Southern Dragon Kung Fu
A Norwegian architectural style called Dragestil